Wasps' Nests is the 1995 debut album by The 6ths, a side-project created by Stephin Merritt of The Magnetic Fields. Merritt wrote and recorded the album, inviting different vocalists to sing lead.

Like the band's name, the album title is a tongue-twister.

"Yet Another Girl" originally only appeared on the vinyl release of the album, but was later included on Merritt's 2011 compilation Obscurities.

Track listing

Notes

1995 debut albums
The 6ths albums
Factory Records albums